Kristina Nicole Groves (born December 4, 1976) is a Canadian retired speed skater. She is Canada's most decorated skater in the World Single Distances Championships with 13 career medals in this event. She won four Olympic medals: she won two silver medals at the 2006 Winter Olympics in Turin, in the 1,500 meters and team pursuit, and she won the silver medal in the 1500 m event and the bronze medal in the 3000 m event at the Vancouver 2010 Winter Olympics.

As of 2012, she was ranked sixth on the women's Adelskalender, her teammates Cindy Klassen and Christine Nesbitt were ranked first and seventh respectively.

Career

Groves made her Olympic debut in Salt Lake City for the 2002 Winter Olympics held in the United States. She finished 20th at 1500 m, 8th at 3000 m and 10th at 5000 m.

Four years later, during the 2006 Winter Olympics games held in Turin, Italy, Groves  participated in five events (1000 m, 1500 m, 3000 m, 5000 m, team pursuit). She finished 5th at 1000 m, 2nd at the 1500 m, 8th at the 3000 m, 6th at the 5000 m, and 2nd in the team pursuit with the Canadian team.

She was the 2008 Single Distances World Champion on the 3000-m. She won a medal in every event that she skated at these championships, as she also won an additional 2 silver medals and 2 bronze medals.

During the 2008–2009 world cup season, Groves won 12 medals including four gold.  During the 2009 World Single Distances Championships held at the new Richmond Olympic Oval, near Vancouver, British Columbia, Canada, her career took an amazing turn when Groves became the most decorated speed skating athlete in the country at this event, surpassing the well-known Jeremy Wotherspoon with 13 medals, compared to his 10. She is also the world cup winner for a second year in a row at 1500 m event.

During the Calgary Essent ISU Worldcup held at the Olympic Oval, Groves set a world record on December 6, 2009, at the team pursuit with teammates Christine Nesbitt and Brittany Schussler with a time of two minutes 55.79 seconds.

Groves qualified for 5 events for the 2010 Winter Olympic Games held in Vancouver and participated in the 1000 m, 1500 m, 3000 m, 5000 m and team pursuit, more than any other athletes on the Canadian speed skating team. In her first event at the Olympics, the 3000 metres, she won a bronze medal. On February 18 she finished fourth in the 1000 metres, .06 seconds behind the bronze medal winner. Her teammate Christine Nesbitt won the gold medal. On February 21, she won a silver medal in the 1500 metres. She became the 11th Canadian to win at least four medals at the Olympics (Summer or Winter).

Personal life
Born in Ottawa, Groves attended Fielding Drive Public School and Brookfield High School. She trained with the Ottawa Pacers Speed Skating Club. She majored in kinesiology at University of Calgary and graduated in 2004. Groves was inducted into the Ottawa Sports Hall of Fame in 2014.

Personal records 

Groves' current Adelskalender score is 157.616, which places 6th of all time.

Source: SpeedskatingResults.com.

World records 

Source: SpeedSkatingStats.com.

References and notes

External links
SpeedSkatingBase.eu PB's and link to results Kristina Groves
Results and records of Kristina Groves at SpeedSkatingStats.com

1976 births
Living people
Canadian female speed skaters
Sportspeople from Ottawa
Speed skaters at the 2002 Winter Olympics
Speed skaters at the 2006 Winter Olympics
Speed skaters at the 2010 Winter Olympics
Olympic speed skaters of Canada
University of Calgary alumni
Olympic silver medalists for Canada
Olympic bronze medalists for Canada
Olympic medalists in speed skating
Canadian people of Norwegian descent
Medalists at the 2010 Winter Olympics
Medalists at the 2006 Winter Olympics
World Allround Speed Skating Championships medalists
World Single Distances Speed Skating Championships medalists
21st-century Canadian women